The SFS Group AG  is a global leader in application-critical precision components and assemblies, mechanical fastening systems, quality tooling and logistics systems. The headquarters are located in Heerbrugg, Switzerland.

History

The history of SFS began in 1928 in what was then the Stadler hardware store in Altstätten, Switzerland. In 1949, a branch was opened in nearby Heerbrugg. Motivated by supply bottlenecks, Josef Stadler and Hans Huber decided to set up their own screw production and jointly founded SFS Presswerk AG in 1960. Production was carried out by cold forming (also known as cold massive forming).

Both trading and manufacturing activities were continuously expanded in the following decades. From 1971, the company built up an international network of market organizations. In 1993, the activities were combined under the umbrella of SFS Holding AG, and in 2014 the name was changed to SFS Group AG. Today, the activities are divided into the three segments Engineered Components, Fastening Systems and Distribution & Logistics.

Today, SFS operates more than 100 trading, logistics and manufacturing locations worldwide. Through various acquisitions, SFS has been able to expand its competence portfolio to include plastic injection molding technology and deep drawing technology.

On September 1, 2012, SFS acquired Singapore-based Unisteel Technology Group, which operates in the field of miniature fasteners (for smartphones and hard drives, for example) and has production facilities in Malaysia and China. Although SFS itself also produces miniature screws, which with a diameter of 0.5 mm are among the thinnest in the world, it was increasingly losing market share in this area of application due to the continuous exodus of the cell phone industry. By acquiring the Unisteel Technology Group, SFS consolidated its position in this market segment. With the expansion of production capacities in Nansha (CN), the company is further increasing component production in Asia.

Since 7 May 2014 SFS is listed on the SIX Swiss Exchange.

With the 2016 acquisitions of Stamm (Switzerland) and Tegra Medical (USA), SFS has expanded its position in the growing medical technology industry. This gives SFS access to a large, largely complementary portfolio of customers.

In 2018, the claim "Inventing success together" was introduced, which gives expression to the DNA of SFS that has already existed since its foundation. In this context, the brands SFS intec and SFS unimarket merged and now appear as SFS.

With the acquisition of Hoffmann SE, headquartered in Munich (Germany) in 2021, SFS is expanding its range of quality tools and creating new development opportunities through the internationalization of its trading business.

Corporate organisation

The SFS Group consists of three operating segments which represent the three business models: 
 Engineered Components: Customized precision components, fastening systems and assemblies with the brands SFS (Automotive and Industrial Division), Unisteel (Electronics Division) and Tegra Medical (Medical Division)
 Fastening Systems: Application-optimized fastening and taping systems with the brands SFS (Construction Division) and GESIPA® (Riveting Division)
 Distribution & Logistics: Market-driven ranges of C-parts for industry and trade, quality tools and innovative logistics solutions with the SFS (Distribution & Logistics Switzerland Division) and Hoffmann (Distribution & Logistics International Division) brands.

The three operating segments are supported by the cross-segment functions Technology and Services.

Based on its core technologies of cold forming, precision machining, deep drawing and plastic injection molding, fastening technology, blind riveting technology and tooling technology, SFS Group supplies various sales markets. These include the automotive, construction, hardware, electrical, electronics and aerospace industries as well as medical technology.

Facts and figures 

Source: SFS Group

Apprentices at SFS
SFS has always invested heavily in the training of its own junior staff. The most important element is the promotion of young people through vocational training. In Switzerland in particular, dual training enjoys a high status. Every year, around 160 apprentices are trained in eleven professions - this corresponds to just under 7% of the entire Swiss workforce. Worldwide, around 5% of employees are in a dual training program.

References

External links 
 Website SFS
 Annual Report SFS
 Sustainability Report SFS

External links
 

Manufacturing companies of Switzerland
Swiss companies established in 1928
Companies listed on the SIX Swiss Exchange
Manufacturing companies established in 1928